Bharathiar University is a public state university in Coimbatore, Tamil Nadu, India.  Named after Tamil poet Subramania Bharati, the university was established in February 1982 under the provision of Bharathiar University Act, 1981 (Act 1 of 1982) and was recognized by the University Grants Commission (UGC) in 1985.

Bharathiar University celebrated its silver jubilee celebrations on 24 February 2007. The president of India, A. P. J. Abdul Kalam, and the chief minister of Tamil Nadu, Karunanidhi, were chief guests. Bharathiar University provides graduate, masters, M.Phil. and Ph.D. programs in various subjects. The university is known for its stringent Phd evaluation guidelines.

Departments 

Department of Electronics & Instrumentation

Department of Human Genetics and Molecular Biology

Department of Zoology

Department of Botany

Affiliated colleges and institutes

Institutes affiliated to the university include 13 Government Colleges, 1 Air Force Administrative College, 3 Constituent Colleges, 1 University PG Extension and Research Centre, 16 Aided Colleges and 99 Self Financing Colleges.

Rankings

Bharathiar University was ranked 21st overall in India by National Institutional Ranking Framework of 2020 and 13th among universities.

References

External links

 

 
Universities and colleges in Coimbatore
Educational institutions established in 1982
1982 establishments in Tamil Nadu